László Sárosi (27 February 1932 – 2 April 2016) was a Hungarian footballer and coach.

During his club career he played for Vasas SC. He earned 46 caps for the Hungary national football team from 1957 to 1965, and participated in the 1958 FIFA World Cup, 1962 FIFA World Cup, and the 1964 European Nations' Cup.

References

Profile 
Hungary – Record International Players

1932 births
2016 deaths
Hungarian footballers
Hungary international footballers
1958 FIFA World Cup players
1962 FIFA World Cup players
1964 European Nations' Cup players
Vasas SC players
Hungarian football managers
Debreceni VSC managers
MTK Budapest FC managers
Ferencvárosi TC managers
Footballers from Budapest
Association football defenders
Nemzeti Bajnokság I managers